Parag More (born 8 June 1985) is an Indian cricketer. He is a right-handed batsman and right-arm off-break bowler who played for Maharashtra. He was born in Pune.

More has played for Maharashtra at Under-14, Under-16, Under-19, Under-22, and Under-25 level, as well as for West Zone Under 16, Under-19s. He was also Captain of Under-16, Under-19, Under-22 for Maharashtra. made a single first-class appearance for Maharashtra, during the 2004–05 season, against Tamil Nadu. He was part of Rajasthan Royals squad in 2008 which won the first Indian Premier League trophy.

External links
Parag More at Cricket Archive

1985 births
Living people
Indian cricketers
Maharashtra cricketers
Cricketers from Pune